"Low" is the debut single by American rapper and singer Flo Rida featuring fellow American rapper and singer T-Pain, from the former's debut studio album Mail on Sunday and also featured on the soundtrack to the 2008 film Step Up 2: The Streets. An official remix was made which also features Pitbull. The song peaked at number one on the U.S. Billboard Hot 100.

The song was a massive success worldwide and was the longest-running number-one single of 2008 in the United States, spending ten consecutive weeks atop the Billboard Hot 100. With over seven million digital downloads, it has been certified Diamond by the RIAA, and was the most downloaded single of the 2000s decade, measured by paid digital downloads. The song was named third on the Billboard Hot 100 Songs of the Decade.

Composition 

Several of T-Pain's stylistic effects are present in this song, including Auto-Tune and call and answer during the chorus. It is a crunk song that contains electronic elements such as 808-style handclaps and an arpeggiated note sequence instead of a chord progression. Flo Rida has sexually charged (but not explicit) lyrics, for example he refers to a woman's buttocks as "birthday cakes" which "stole the show". T-Pain also relies heavily on synthesizers. The song is written in the key of E♭ minor and at different times different instrumentation cycles, i.e., sometimes only the synthesizer plays, sometimes only the bass, sometimes only the vocals. Flo Rida uses a style that is common in 1990s hip-hop party music. "Low" is written in common time with a moderate tempo of 128 beats per minute while T-Pain's vocal range spans nearly two octaves from B♭2 to F4.

Music video
The music video of "Low" was directed by Bernard Gourley and contains certain clips from Step Up 2: The Streets. It also contains cameos from Rick Ross, DJ Khaled, Cool & Dre, Briana Evigan, Torch and Gunplay of Triple C's and Jermaine Dupri. Also, T-Pain and Flo Rida are in a nightclub in a few scenes. The music video reached the number one spot on 106 & Park for five days and 22 days on TRL. The music video was also nominated at the 2008 MTV Video Music Awards for Best Male Video and Best Hip-Hop Video, but lost to Chris Brown's "With You" (Best Male Video) and Lil Wayne's "Lollipop" (Best Hip-Hop Video) music videos.

Track listing
European CD single
"Low" – 3:53
"Low" (Travis Barker Remix) – 4:15

Europe maxi-CD
"Low" – 3:53
"Low" (Instrumental) – 3:53
"Birthday" (Amended Version)
"Low" (Video)

Chart performance
The song debuted at number 91 on the U.S. Billboard Hot 100 for the week of November 6, 2007, and reached number one for the week of December 30, 2007. The song generated the second greatest one-week digital sales in the history of Billboards Digital Songs chart (behind Flo Rida's "Right Round"), with 467,000 digital copies in one week. "Low" was number one on the Billboard Hot 100 for ten weeks and remained in the top ten of the chart for 23 weeks, making it both T-Pain and Flo Rida's most successful single to date. The song stayed on the Hot 100 for 39 weeks, before dropping out in June 2008.

As the first number one on the Hot 100 of 2008, "Low" held the top position longer than any song did in 2008 (see List of Billboard Hot 100 number-one singles of 2008), and was the longest-running Hot 100 number one single since Beyoncé's "Irreplaceable." The song is also the longest-running number one single in the history of the Billboard Digital Songs chart, topping the chart for 13 weeks, and also on the now-defunct Pop 100 chart, where it ruled for 12 weeks. For the week of June 29, 2008, it became the first song ever to sell four million digital copies in the US, and then for the week of June 21, 2009, the first to sell over five million copies. It was best-selling digitally-downloaded song of all time until it was surpassed by The Black Eyed Peas' "I Gotta Feeling" in May 2010. The song sold over six million in digital sales by August 7, 2011, and reached its seven millionth sales mark in sales in June 2014.

The physical release of the single occurred in the UK for the week of March 24, 2008. For the week of July 20, 2008, the song moved up to number 19 on the UK Singles Chart, several months after its official release. Although it failed to reach number one in the UK, it amassed 53 weeks inside the UK top 75 (making it the joint 20th longest-runner of all-time), and 75 weeks inside the top 100. As of January 2012, the song has sold 613,434 copies in the UK.

The song was ranked at number 26 on Billboard's All Time Hot 100. The song was also ranked the number-one song for 2008 in Billboards ranking of the Billboard Year-End Hot 100 singles of 2008. For the week of December 28, 2008, it was listed at number 11 on the UK Singles Chart year-end countdown and was named the highest-selling single in Australia in 2008.

Charts

Weekly charts

Year-end charts

Decade-end charts

Certifications

Cover versions and media usage
The song was performed live with the band Simple Plan at the 2008 MuchMusic Video Awards. Albuquerque, New Mexico based crunkcore group Brokencyde released a cover of this song on "THA $C3N3 MiXTaPe" in 2008. Blink-182 drummer Travis Barker added a drum version cover of the song. On October 23, 2012, the cast of The Big Bang Theory made a flash mob during the live taping of an episode, which featured the song as well as others. The song was featured in Suburgatory. The song was also featured in Tropic Thunder and Zookeeper.

In 2019, the viral video "Jessica" or "Jessica, did you sleep with your teacher?" used the song in the background that "Jessica" sung along with until her "Mom" confronted her about sleeping with her teacher. A year later, in 2020, the American grocery chain Kroger and their subsidiary stores began to use the song's chorus for a series of animated ads, appropriately highlighting coupons and low prices. At the start of 2021, the ads became a minor Internet meme with user-generated YouTube and TikTok remixes. Also, a parody of the song highlighting price drop was used in the 2021 Lazada 11.11 TV commercial featuring K-Pop boy group Seventeen in the ASEAN region, where it was sung in Indonesian, Tagalog, Thai, Vietnamese, and English.

Another way the song is used in meme culture is in "fake covers," where the song is remixed and sung in the style of a different artist, under the title of "Apple Bottom Jeans".

References

External links
 "Low" music video at YouTube

2007 debut singles
2008 singles
Flo Rida songs
T-Pain songs
Billboard Hot 100 number-one singles
Canadian Hot 100 number-one singles
Number-one singles in Australia
Irish Singles Chart number-one singles
Number-one singles in New Zealand
Internet memes introduced in 2021
Songs written by T-Pain
Songs written for films
Songs written by Flo Rida
2007 songs
Atlantic Records singles
Crunk songs
Song recordings produced by T-Pain